H/ACA ribonucleoprotein complex subunit 2 is a protein that in humans is encoded by the NHP2 gene.

This gene is a member of the H/ACA snoRNPs (small nucleolar ribonucleoproteins) gene family. snoRNPs are involved in various aspects of rRNA processing and modification and have been classified into two families: C/D and H/ACA. 

The H/ACA snoRNPs also include the DKC1, NOLA1 and NOLA3 proteins. These four H/ACA snoRNP proteins localize to the dense fibrillar components of nucleoli and to coiled (Cajal) bodies in the nucleus. Both 18S rRNA production and rRNA pseudouridylation are impaired if any one of the four proteins is depleted. The four H/ACA snoRNP proteins are also components of the telomerase complex. This gene encodes a protein related to Saccharomyces cerevisiae Nhp2p. Two transcript variants encoding different isoforms have been found for this gene.

References

Further reading